Ofosu is an Akan surname with Ashanti origins. Notable people with the surname include:

Emmanuel Ofosu Yeboah (born 1977), Ghanaian athlete and activist
Lawrence Henry Yaw Ofosu-Appiah (1920–1990), Ghanaian academic
Michael Ofosu-Appiah (born 1983), Ghanaian footballer
Phil Ofosu-Ayeh (born 1991), German-Ghanaian footballer
Reagy Ofosu (born 1991), German footballer
Samuel Ofosu-Ampofo, Ghanaian politician

Surnames of Akan origin